SOR LH 12 is an turistic bus and long-distance coach produced by bus manufacturer SOR from the Czech Republic since 2005.

Construction features 

LH 12 is two-axle bus with a semi-self supporting bodywork which is welded from closed steel profiles. The outer part of the body is lined with flashing, the interior is lined with plastic sheeting. Some of the lower part of the skeleton are made of stainless steel. The engine and manual gearbox are located at the rear of the vehicle under the floor. Rear driven axle is the Spanish brand DANA, front axle of custom design is trapezoidal with independent wheel suspension. Seats for passengers are disposed on the raised pedestals are spaced 2 + 2 central aisle. The luggage compartment under the floor of the car has a volume of 8 m³. Bus has two doors. The first is located in front of the front axle, the latter can be customized placed in front of or behind the rear axle.

Production and operation 
LH 12 is the flagship bus of company SOR, which was introduced at Autosalon Nitra in 2005.
The manufacturer has responded to the wishes of customers who wanted a classic twelve-meter length Coach, which were in the Czech Republic until then domain competing Karosa. Production of vehicle LH 12 was launched shortly thereafter. LH 12 buses are designed for long-distance lines or for chartered transport. Between transport companies which run this model, includes Veolia Transport ČSAD Vsetín or in Slovakia SAD Humenné.

See also

External links
 Description on the web page of manufacturer
 List of buses

Buses of the Czech Republic
Buses manufactured by SOR